Bijan Abdolkarimi (born 1963) is an Iranian philosopher, thinker, translator, and editor. 
His main interests are ontology, political philosophy and the critique of religious and intellectual traditions. He claims to challenge the dominant ideological discourse in Iran. 
He has participated in debates at Iranian universities and also in IRIB TV4 in which he has opposed the notion of Islamic humanities. 
 
He is also a scholar of Heidegger's thought and philosophy.

Career
Bijan was associate professor of philosophy at Islamic Azad University North Tehran Branch since 2001.
On September 4th, 2021 he was fired from Islamic Azad University “for defending the Pahlavi monarchy”.

Views
The main characteristics of Abdolkarimi's thought may be summarized as follows:
 Abdolkarimi seeks to present a spiritual, meditative interpretation of Heidegger's thought.
 The relation between the West and East is his main issue in his philosophical thinking. He strongly criticizes any ideological, theological understanding of the West and East. He emphasizes a historical, phenomenological understanding of these two traditions.
 He has worked on the theory of the end of theology and its critical connotations. Following Gianni Vattimo, he believes that the main philosophical characteristic of our time is the destroyed ontology. Abdolkarimi interprets Vattimo's idea as the "metaphysicslessness of our time". But in the context of Abdolkarimi's thought, the term metaphysics is not merely in the Greek sense and refers to any historical theoretical tradition.
 Abdolkarimi believes that the  human being's future thought is a kind of nonsecular-nontheological thinking, namely a way of thinking that is in disagreement to the secular, materialistic interpretation of the world, but at the same time does not settle in any historic, theological systems.

Bibliography
 Reflections on the Paradox of Directed Democracy, Eshraghieh Press, Tehran, 1989
 Shariati and Being Politicized, Resa Institute of Cultural Service, Tehran, 1995
 Thought and Politics, Tehran: Elmi o Farhangi, 1977.
 The Story of Me and Thou, Tehran: Critique of Culture, 2001
 Heidegger and Transcendence (A Commentary of Heidegger's Interpretation of Kant's Critique of Pure Reason), Tehran: Critique of Culture, 2002
 Emancipation or Dominance? (A Critique of the System of Religious Education in Iran), with Mohammad Ali Mohammadi, Tehran: Critique of Culture, 2002
 Monism or Pluralism? (Mobile Thinking or Homeless Thought) (A Critique of Daryoush Shaygan's Modern Enchantedness), Tehran: Critique of Culture, 2004
 Nietzscheian World and Us, Elm Publication, Tehran, 2009
 Hegel or Marx? (A Critique of Iranian Intellectuals), Tehran: Critique of Culture, 2002.
 Heidegger in Iran, Iranian Institute of Philosophy, 2013

See also 
Intellectual Movements in Iran
Iranian philosophy
Religious intellectualism in Iran

Sources

External links
 
 Abdolkarimi's Official Website
 Conceptual Approaches in Contemporary Iranian Religious Reformism
 Collection of Abdolkarimi's Lectures in Farsi

1963 births
20th-century essayists
20th-century Iranian philosophers
20th-century translators
21st-century essayists
21st-century Iranian philosophers
21st-century translators
Aligarh Muslim University alumni
Continental philosophers
English–Persian translators
Existentialists
Faculty of Letters and Humanities of the University of Tehran alumni
Heidegger scholars
Iranian essayists
Iranian non-fiction writers
Academic staff of the Islamic Azad University
Living people
Muslim reformers
Writers from Tehran
Persian-language writers
Phenomenologists
University of Tehran alumni
Writers about activism and social change
Writers about globalization
Male non-fiction writers